NCAA Season 78 is the 2002–03 season of the National Collegiate Athletic Association (Philippines), which was hosted by San Beda College, The season opened on June 29, 2002, at the Araneta Coliseum.

This was the first season of Studio 23's coverage (later ABS-CBN Sports+Action) has been produced by ABS-CBN Sports which the NCAA games every Wednesday and Friday afternoon at 2:00 PM to 6:00 PM. The commentators were Bill Velasco, Sev Sarmenta and Bob Novales were presenters and alongside Butch Maniego, Allan Gregorio and others.

Basketball

Elimination round

Men's playoffs

Number of asterisks (*) denotes the number of overtime periods.

See also
 UAAP Season 65

2002 in multi-sport events
78
2002 in Philippine sport
2003 in Philippine sport
2003 in multi-sport events